Kulumani  is a village in the Srirangam taluk of Tiruchirappalli district in Tamil Nadu, India.

Demographics 

As per the 2001 census, Kulumani had a population of 4,586 with 2,282 males and 2,304 females.

References 

 

Villages in Tiruchirappalli district